Striped Trip is a 1961 Soviet comedy film directed by Vladimir Fetin, with the acclaimed tiger tamer Margarita Nazarova in the main role. The movie was seen by 45.8 mil. viewers on the year of release, becoming the Soviet box office leader.

Plot 
To escape from a hot tropical place Shuleykin (Yevgeny Leonov) accepts a position on a ship looking after a cargo of twelve cages with tigers. Chief mate ("starpom" in Russian), played by Ivan Dmitriyev) has continuous arguments with Marianna (Margarita Nazarova) about the little tricks she plays on the crew. One day a stowaway monkey opens the cages and the limited capabilities of Shuleykin get exposed. In this situation Marianna unexpectedly turns into a skilled animal trainer.

Cast 

 Alexey Gribov as Vasily Vasilyevich, captain
 Ivan Dmitriyev as Oleg Petrovich, chief mate
 Margarita Nazarova as Marianna Andreevna, barmaid (voiced by Galina Korotkevich)
 Yevgeny Leonov as Gleb Savelievich Shuleykin, cook, who was forced to impersonate a tiger tamer
 Vladimir Belokurov as Alexey Stepanovich, boatswain
 Nikolai Volkov as agent (voiced by Yefim Kopelyan)
 Aleksandr Benyaminov as Chocoladi, Indian tamer
 Arkadi Trusov as cook
 Vyacheslav Sirin as Motya, sailor, who can famously beat tap dancing
 Aleksei Smirnov as Valya Knysh, sailor on watch
 Alexey Kozhevnikov as radioman
 Alexander Susnin as Sidorenko, sailor
 Nikolay Trofimov as navigator
 Alisa Freindlich as Shuleykin's assistant in the circus buffet
 Vasily Lanovoy as vacationer on the beach
 Yuri Gorobets as militiaman

Production

Concept
The idea of a movie with Margarita Nazarova in the lead originated during the 1959 official visit of the Emperor of Ethiopia Haile Selassie to Moscow: Nikita Khrushchev invited him to a circus performance during which Nazarova brought several tiger cubs to the lodge and received high praise from Khrushchev who wondered why hadn't she been cast in a movie yet.

This motivated all studio executives to start a search for an appropriate screenplay which ended as soon as Viktor Konetsky, a former sailor and a beginning writer, shared his life story with the Lenfilm director, how a bear once escaped from a cage during a sea voyage. The idea of animals running around the ship appealed to Nazarova and her husband and circus partner Konstantin Konstantinovsky who was also suggested the work of a tamer and a stuntman. A young, but promising film director Vladimir Fetin took the job, while Konetsky was "strengthen" by a seasoned screenwriter Aleksei Kapler.

Shooting
All ten tigers from the circus troupe became involved, including Pursh who had already starred in a similar-themed comedy movie Tamer of Tigers and who ended up performing most of the complex scenes. Another addition was a lion Vaska from the Leningrad Zoo who had also made an appearance in Lenfilm's movies such as Don Quixote (1957), She Loves You (1956) and New Adventures of Puss in the Boots (1958), although the tigers didn't get along with him and most of his scenes were shot separately. Lastly, a chimpanzee named Pirate was borrowed from the Kyiv Zoo along with his bride, a monkey Chilita since he refused to leave or act without her.

The animals went through a two-months training on the Matros Zhelezniak cargo ship in Leningrad, while the actual movie was shot in the Black Sea on board of the Fryazino motor vessel. Konstantin Konstantinovsky worked as a stunt double on a number of occasions, most famously during the scene where Oleg Petrovich (played by Ivan Dmitriyev) fights a tiger (revealed during the ending credits). Many other stunts were performed by a fellow tamer Arkady Rudin. The only actor who not only refused to use a stunt double, but also came up with a number of dangerous stunts of his own was Aleksei Smirnov: in one scene he even appears holding tight onto a tiger's tale. In fact Smirnov spent a whole month feeding animals and gaining their trust.

A 23-minute movie Attention, Tigers! which documented the filming process was shot by the main cinematographer Dmitry Meskhiev and released the same year by the Soviet Central Television.

Myths 
The movie production is surrounded by a number of myths which originated with time. Among them is the one concerning the scene showing Shuleykin (played by Yevgeny Leonov) taking a bath when a tiger (Pursh) quietly enters the cabin. As the legend goes, Leonov refused to perform until he was convinced they would be separated by a special glass; yet the glass was blinking and the director secretly ordered to remove it while the actor's face was covered with foam, so when the tiger touched Leonov he acted naturally and ran away in fear, completely naked. Yet the second unit cinematographer Dmitry Dolinin denied the whole story, saying there was no talk of the glass at all, Leonov was aware of the tiger's presence and acted according to the script despite being really scared.

Another popular myth was voiced in the book Striped Trip (2003) by some Maksim Mogilevsky. According to him the lion Vaska was killed on director's order, because he refused to take sleeping pills, it was the last shooting day and Fetin desperately needed a scene with the ship's crew carrying a sleeping lion, so one pyrotechnician "drank a glass of vodka" and shot him through the ear. This myth was dispelled in 2010 by Mikhail Kozlov, a leading research fellow of the Zoological Institute of the Russian Academy of Sciences and an occasional journalist who dedicated an article to the famous lions of St. Petersburg, calling Vaska a local celebrity. He mentioned how "several decades later scary stories appeared out of nowhere" surrounding the lion's death despite Vaska safely returned home and lived many years after.

Same book also wrongly states that Vaska belonged to the Odessa Zoo and contains other factual errors that were later exaggerated by journalists. Among them is yet another anecdote about one of the tigers who managed to escape the shooting zone in Odessa to the nearby Arcadia Beach full of people and basically repeated the original scenario, causing panic, but was stopped by some heroic lighting technician who hit the tiger with a glove on the nose and made him retreat. According to the documentary by Aleksei Vasiliev the tiger indeed escaped to the nearby territory (not the beach), but was quickly caught and returned by Nazarova herself.

References

External links 

1961 films
1961 comedy films
Films directed by Vladimir Fetin
Soviet comedy films
Russian comedy films